Silcott Spring is an unincorporated community in Loudoun County, Virginia. Silcott Spring lies to the south of the North Fork Catoctin Creek at the crossroads of Paxson (VA 725) and Silcott Spring (VA 690) Roads.

Unincorporated communities in Loudoun County, Virginia
Washington metropolitan area
Unincorporated communities in Virginia